Rosamund Greaves, 11th Countess of Dysart (15 February 1914 – 17 December 2003) was a Scottish peer.

Rosamund was the eldest of three daughters of Wenefryde Agatha Greaves (1889–1975), 10th Countess of Dysart and Major Owain Edward Whitehead Greaves. On her mother's death in 1975 Lady Rosamund became the 11th Countess of Dysart.

Rosamund Greaves never married or had children; therefore, on her death in December 2003, her younger sister, 	Lady Katherine, succeeded to the titles of Countess of Dysart and Lady Huntingtower.

References

External links
 

1914 births
2003 deaths
20th-century British women politicians
Earls of Dysart
Hereditary women peers
Rosamund Greaves, 11th Countess of Dysart

Dysart